The Darjah Utama Nila Utama is Singapore's third most prestigious national honour instituted in 1975. It is an Order  conferred by the President of Singapore and was originally intended to be the highest award to be conferred to a foreign dignitary. It was later awarded to mostly citizens of Singapore. 

As of 1 August 2019, the Order has three different grades:
 the Order of Nila Utama (With High Distinction),
 the Order of Nila Utama (With Distinction), and
 the Order of Nila Utama.
Recipients of the honour are entitled to use the post-nominal letters DUNU.

History
Prior to August 2019, the 3 grades of the Order of Nila Utama were known as:

 First Class of the Order of Nila Utama
 Second Class of the Order of Nila Utama
 Third Class of the Order of Nila Utama

Recipients

References

External links
Singapore Prime Minister's Office - The Order of Nila Utama

Civil awards and decorations of Singapore